Raymond Trencavel may refer to:

 Raymond I Trencavel (died 1167)
 Raymond II Trencavel (1207–1265)
 Raymond Roger Trencavel (1185–1209)